Frederick "Jerry" Morgan was a professional footballer who played for Bristol Rovers between 1919 and 1925, having previously played 2 games for Bristol City. He was part of a large footballing family from Barton Hill in Bristol His brother Jim played for Wolves, and brother Tom played for Bristol City. His nephew William James Morgan also obtained 104 caps for Bristol Rovers between 1946 and 1952. Jerry Morgan scored two hat tricks for Rovers, one against Worksop Town in a famous 9-0 cup victory in 1920, and the other against Norwich in 1923.

He served in the Royal Navy during World War I as a stoker on board the dreadnought HMS Marlborough. He died of throat cancer in Bristol in 1953.

Sources

References

1897 births
1958 deaths
Footballers from Bristol
English footballers
Association football forwards
English Football League players
Bristol Rovers F.C. players
Bristol City F.C. players